The women's halfpipe competition in snowboarding at the 2022 Winter Olympics was held on 9 February (qualification) and 10 February (final), at the Genting Snow Park in Zhangjiakou. Chloe Kim of the United States won the event, defending her 2018 title. Queralt Castellet of Spain won the silver medal and Sena Tomita of Japan the bronze, the first Olympic medals for both of them.

The 2018 silver medalist, Liu Jiayu, qualified at the Olympics, but the bronze medalist, Arielle Gold, did not qualify. At the 2021–22 FIS Snowboard World Cup, only three halfpipe events were held before the Olympics. Cai Xuetong were leading the ranking, followed by Tomita and Mitsuki Ono. Kim was the 2021 world champion, with Maddie Mastro and Castellet being the silver and bronze medalists, respectively. Kim was also the 2021 X-Games winner in super-pipe, ahead of Mastro and Haruna Matsumoto.

Qualification

A total of 25 snowboarders qualified to compete at the games. For an athlete to compete they must have a minimum of 50.00 FIS points in Big Air or Slopestyle on the FIS Points List on January 17, 2022 and a top 30 finish in a World Cup event in Big Air or slopestyle or at the FIS Snowboard World Championships 2021. A country could enter a maximum of four athletes into the event.

Results

Qualification
 Q — Qualified for the Final

The top 12 athletes in the qualifiers advanced to the Final.

Final

References

Women's snowboarding at the 2022 Winter Olympics